Montserrado-6 is an electoral district for the elections to the House of Representatives of Liberia. The district covers the Paynesville communities of S. D. Cooper, GSA Road Rockville, King Gray-ELWA, Kpelle Town and Rehab/Borbor Town.

Elected representatives

References

Electoral districts in Liberia